The year 593 BC was a year of the pre-Julian Roman calendar. In the Roman Empire, it was known as year 161 Ab urbe condita . The denomination 593 BC for this year has been used since the early medieval period, when the Anno Domini calendar era became the prevalent method in Europe for naming years.

Events
 Sappho returns from exile in Sicily (or 594 BC).
 Napata is sacked by the Egyptians and the Kushite capital relocates to Meroë.

Births

Deaths

References